Rita Livesi (born 1915) is an Italian former stage and film actress. She is known for Amore amaro (1974), Il berretto a sonagli (1985) and La ragazza del vagone letto (1979).

Selected filmography
 Cavalry (1936)
 Adam's Tree (1936)
 The Former Mattia Pascal (1937)
 The Man from Nowhere (1937)
 The Lady in White (1938)
 Special Correspondents (1943)
 The Children Are Watching Us (1944)
 Torment (1950)
 Nobody's Children (1951)
 Who is Without Sin (1952)
 Lieutenant Giorgio (1952)
 La voce del sangue (1952)
 Torna! (1953)
 High School (1954)
 Desperate Farewell (1955)

References

External links

1915 births
Possibly living people
20th-century Italian actresses
Italian film actresses
Italian stage actresses
People from Siligo